Masonwabe Maseti (born 8 June 1987 in Cape Town, Republic of South Africa) is a football player. He played for the South African team FC Cape Town prior to its dissolution in 2017.

Career
Maseti began his career with Hellenic Football Academy. He signed for Ajax CT in 2004, having come through their youth academy, and made his first team debut in the same year. He later played for Free State Stars and Ikapa Sporting, before in summer 2009 signed for Northern Cypriot top club Hamitköy S.K. After his return of Cyprus, signed for Chippa United.

References

1987 births
Living people
Ikapa Sporting F.C. players
South African soccer players
Free State Stars F.C. players
Expatriate footballers in Northern Cyprus
F.C. Cape Town players
Association football midfielders
Hellenic F.C. players
Sportspeople from Cape Town
Chippa United F.C. players
South Africa international soccer players
Cape Town Spurs F.C. players